The Cathedral of St. Joseph in Gatineau, Quebec, is a parish of the Roman Catholic Church and seat of the Archdiocese of Gatineau (Archidioecesis Gatinensis). The cathedral church is located in the former city of Hull, at 245, boulevard Saint-Joseph.

Its construction began in 1951 and ended the following year under the plan and design of Lucien Sarra-Bournet.

See also
Catholic Church in Canada

References

External links

Roman Catholic cathedrals in Quebec
Buildings and structures in Gatineau
Roman Catholic churches completed in 1952
1952 establishments in Quebec
20th-century Roman Catholic church buildings in Canada